Fatehgarh Sahib district is one of the twenty-three districts of the state of Punjab, India, with its headquarters in the town of Fatehgarh Sahib.

The district came into existence on 13April 1992, Baisakhi Day and derives its name from Sahibzada Fateh Singh, the youngest son of 10th Guru Gobind Singh, who along with his brother was bricked-up alive on the orders of Suba Sirhind, Wazir Khan in 1704, and which is now the site of the 'Gurudwara Fatehgarh Sahib'.

As of 2011, it is the second least populous district of Punjab (out of 22), after Barnala.

Important cities and towns
 Amloh
 Bassi Pathana
 Khamanon
 Mandi Gobindgarh
 Sirhind-Fategarh 
 Fatehgarh Sahib

Demographics

According to the 2011 census Fatehgarh Sahib district has a population of 600,163. This gives it a ranking of 525th in India (out of a total of 640). Its population growth over the decade 2001-2011 was 11.39%. Fatehgarh Sahib has a sex ratio of 871 females for every 1000 males, and a literacy rate of 80.3%. Scheduled Castes made up 32.07% of the population.

At the time of the 2011 census, 89.92% of the population spoke Punjabi and 9.15% Hindi as their first language.

Politics

Notable individuals
 Giani Ditt Singh, scholar, poet, editor and eminent Singh Sabha reformer.
 Tarsem Jassar (Songwriter, Singer, Actor).
 Dilpreet Dhillon (Singer, Actor)
 Narinder Batth (Lyricist)
 Kulbir Jhinjer (Singer)
 Babbu Maan (Singer)

References

External links

 Official website
 District Map of Fatehgarh Sahib district

 
Districts of Punjab, India
1992 establishments in Punjab, India